Gov. George Truitt House is a historic home located near Magnolia, Kent County, Delaware.  It was built about 1796, and consists of a -story, stuccoed brick main house, with a -story braced frame wing.  The house is in the late-Georgian style. It features a gable roof with an interesting modillioned box cornice and an exterior chimney with sloped weatherings and corbelled lip.  It was the home of Delaware Governor George Truitt (1756-1818).

It was listed on the National Register of Historic Places in 1978.

References

Houses on the National Register of Historic Places in Delaware
Georgian architecture in Delaware
Houses completed in 1796
Houses in Kent County, Delaware
National Register of Historic Places in Kent County, Delaware
1796 establishments in the United States